Ahmed Harrak Srifi is a prominent Moroccan scholar from the tribe of Ahl Srif in the north of Morocco.

The family tree of Ahmed Harrak Srifi

His father is Abdelsalam Harrak Srifi son of Taher Al Alami Al Safsafi  son of Muhamad son of Ali al Harrak   son of  Hassan son of Husayn son of Ali son of Muhamad son of Abdullah son of Yussuf son of Ahmad son of Husayn son of Malik son of Abdelkarim son of Hamdoun son of Musa (Musa is the brother of Abdeslam Ben Mchich) son of Mchich son of Abi Bakr al Alami al Idrissi son of Alison of Abu Hurma son of Issa son of Salam al-Arouss' son of Ahmad Mizwar son of Ali Haydara son of Muhammad son of Idris II son of Idris I son of Abdullah al-Kamelson of Hassan al-Muthanna son of Hasan ibn Ali son of Ali Ibn Abi Talib and Fatima al-Zahraa, daughter of Prophet Muhammad

Area of specialization

As a Muslim theologian, he specialized in the sciences of the Quran and the science of  Hadith narration with regards to the different Quran reading interpretation. He was among the most prominent of Moroccan scholars in this science in the 20th century. Abdel Hay al Kattani in his book called the Appendix –Al Fehress- said that Ahmed Harrak Srifi has received the narration science from his father Abdelsallam Harrak Srifi who was a narrator and a scholar himself.

His teachers

In Hadith narration
His Father Abdelsallam Harrak Srifi
Muhammad Srifi Bujediani
Ahmad  Temsamani Sumati

In Tajwid
Al Maqi Ben Yarmoq al Sumati
Hashemi ben Hassan Srifi Dafeni.

His works
 Collection of biographies of the most prominent Sheiks and Sayyids  
 The register of the translations and licences of Ahmad El Fassi

His Death
Ahmed Harrak Srifi was killed in the Rif war in Morocco in 1925. It is commonly known that in this war against the Spanish colonization, there were two kinds of resistant movements in Morocco. The armed one led by Abd el-Krim and the passive one led by El reissouni. Ahmed Harrak Srifi was with the royalist passive movement. A tradition that characterized the Harrak sayyids for centuries.

Notes and references

Moroccan scholars
Moroccan Maliki scholars
Moroccan writers
Moroccan biographers
Hadith scholars
Muslim family trees
1925 deaths
Year of birth missing
19th-century Moroccan people